Robert Owen (born 17 October 1947) is an English former footballer who played as a forward in the Football League for Bury, Manchester City, Swansea City, Carlisle United, Northampton Town, Workington and Doncaster Rovers. While at Manchester City he was part of the side that won the 1968 FA Charity Shield, in which he scored two goals.

References

1947 births
Living people
People from Farnworth
Association football forwards
English footballers
Bury F.C. players
Manchester City F.C. players
Swansea City A.F.C. players
Carlisle United F.C. players
Northampton Town F.C. players
Workington A.F.C. players
Doncaster Rovers F.C. players
Gainsborough Trinity F.C. players
English Football League players